Akste is a lake in Põlva Parish, Põlva County, in southeastern Estonia.

See also
List of lakes of Estonia
Akste (village in Estonia)

Akste
Põlva Parish
Akste